Thomas Case (b Liverpool 14 July 1844 – d Falmouth 31 October 1925) was an English academic, philosopher, sportsman and author.

Case was educated at Rugby and Balliol. He was Fellow of Brasenose College, Oxford, from 1868 to 1870; Tutor at Balliol from 1870 to 1876; and on the staff of Corpus Christi College, Oxford, from then onwards. He was Waynflete Professor of Metaphysical Philosophy at Oxford from 1889 to 1910; and President of Corpus  from 1904 to 1924.

Case was also a first-class cricketer (active 1864–1869) who played for Oxford University and Middlesex.  He played in 35 first-class matches. He was a righthanded batsman who totalled 982 career runs with a highest score of 116. His son's, William and Thomas, were also first-class cricketers.

He married Elizabeth Donn (1848-1927), the daughter of composer William Sterndale Bennett and he was buried on 4 November in Wolvercote cemetery, near Oxford.

References

External links

1844 births
1925 deaths
English cricketers
Middlesex cricketers
Oxford University cricketers
Marylebone Cricket Club cricketers
Gentlemen of Middlesex cricketers
Southgate cricketers
Gentlemen of England cricketers
People educated at Rugby School
Alumni of Balliol College, Oxford
Fellows of Brasenose College, Oxford
Presidents of Corpus Christi College, Oxford
Waynflete Professors of Metaphysical Philosophy